I Am Who (stylized as I am WHO) is the second extended play by South Korean boy group Stray Kids. The EP was released digitally and physically on August 6, 2018, by JYP Entertainment. A showcase titled Stray Kids Unveil: Op. 02: I Am Who was held the day before the release. The album sold 79,684 physical copies in the month of August.

The album was released in two versions—an “I am” version and a “WHO” version.

Track listing
Credits adapted from Melon

Charts

Weekly charts

Year-end charts

Certifications

Notes

References

2018 EPs
JYP Entertainment EPs
Korean-language EPs
Stray Kids EPs
IRiver EPs